The Hessian Ried is a low-lying, agricultural region that forms part of the northeastern area of the Upper Rhine Plain. It is situated in South Hesse in west central Germany.

Location and description 
The Hessian Ried lies between the River Rhine to the west, the Bergstraße route in the east and between the town of Lampertheim in the south to town of Groß-Gerau.

In former times the lowlands of the Ried were largely marshland and repeatedly affected by serious flooding of the Rhine and Weschnitz. During the time of the Roman Empire the area was therefore avoided and the road, the Strata Montana, on the Bergstraße, built higher up along the edge of the Odenwald. Later Lorsch Abbey became an important centre in the middle of the Ried.

Not until the regulation of the Rhine and Weschnitz did it become increasingly suitable for agriculture. In addition, widespread drainage produced land for agricultural use in the wake of the "General Cultural Plan" of 1925. In the mild climate asparagus and tobacco thrive. Because of the proximity of the large centres of population nearby (the Rhine-Main and Rhine-Neckar regions) vegetables and lettuce are grown widely. Due to the low precipitation in the Hessian Ried, increasing amounts of artificial watering is needed.

Heavy groundwater extraction for public water supplies, for industry and for agriculture have, especially in dry periods (around 1976 and 1993), led to subsidence and damage to buildings and, especially in the forests and wetlands to damage to groundwater-dependent vegetation. This led to considerable disputes between the water companies, landowners, farmers, the forestry industry and conservation agencies. These conflicts were defused by the introduction of a more flexible management of groundwater extraction that is now oriented towards the groundwater-land relationship. In addition the Hessian Ried Water Association was founded in 1979 and had worked to improve the groundwater.

Origin of the name 
The name Hessisches Ried is probably derived from the reeds that once covered much of the landscape. Frequent flooding - especially from the Rhine and the Weschnitz – made the Hessian Ried an ideal habitat for these plants. Today large beds of reed are very rare and are mostly found in nature reserves.

Another explanation may be that Ried was the name given to a forest clearing of the area in order to make it usable for agriculture.

Sub-regions 

 Altrhein
 Kühkopf-Knoblochsaue – nature reserve with the island of Kühkopf and the Knoblochsaue to the north
 Rhine island of Nonnenau near Ginsheim
 Schwarzbachaue near Trebur
 Riedsee bei Leeheim
 Riedsee bei Biblis
 Biedensand nature reserve near Lampertheim

Towns and villages in the Hessian Ried 
 The Alsbach-Hähnlein villages of: (Alsbach lies on the Bergstraße)
 Hähnlein
 The Bensheim quarters of (Bensheim itself lies on the Bergstraße)
 Fehlheim
 Langwaden
 Schwanheim
 Biblis and its villages:
 Nordheim
 Wattenheim
 Biebesheim am Rhein
 Bürstadt and its quarters:
 Bobstadt
 Riedrode
 Büttelborn
 Einhausen (Hesse)
 Gernsheim and its quarters:
 Allmendfeld
 Klein-Rohrheim
 Griesheim
 Groß-Gerau and its quarters:
Berkach
 Dornberg
 Dornheim
 Wallerstädten
Nauheim
 Groß-Rohrheim
 Lampertheim and its quarters:
 Hofheim
 Hüttenfeld
 Neuschloß
 Rosengarten
 Lorsch
 Pfungstadt and its quarters of:
 Eich
 Eschollbrücken
 Hahn
 Riedstadt and its town quarters:
 Crumstadt
 Erfelden
 Goddelau
 Leeheim
 Wolfskehlen
 Stockstadt
 Rüsselsheim with the town quarter of:
 Bauschheim
 Trebur and its villages of:
 Astheim
 Geinsheim
 Hessenaue
 Kornsand
 Der Zwingenberg quarter (Zwingenberg itself lies on the Bergstraße)
 Rodau

Literature 
 Peter Prinz-Grimm und Ingeborg Grimm: Wetterau und Mainebene. Borntraeger, Berlin/Stuttgart, 2002,  (Sammlung geologischer Führer 93), especially p. 12.

External links 

 Hessisches Ried environmental atlas
 Das Hessische Ried zwischen Vernässung und Trockenheit: eine komplexe wasserwirtschaftliche Problematik Teil 1 (pdf; 6.3 MB) · Teil 2 · 70 page brochure by the Hessian Ministry for the Environment, 2005 (pdf files; 5.6 MB)

Geography of Hesse
Regions of Hesse